Brett Stegmaier (born July 2, 1983) is an American professional golfer who currently plays on the PGA Tour.

Amateur career
Stegmaier played for the University of Florida where he was a Southeastern Conference champion and All-American.

Professional career
Prior to earning his PGA Tour card for the 2016 season, Stegmaier spent multiple years on mini-tours and the Web.com Tour (2013−15).

Stegmaier's best PGA Tour finish was a tie for 2nd place at the 2016 Shriners Hospitals for Children Open. At that tournament, he was the second and third round leader.

Playoff record
Web.com Tour playoff record (0–1)

See also
2015 Web.com Tour Finals graduates
2017 Web.com Tour Finals graduates

References

External links

American male golfers
Florida Gators men's golfers
PGA Tour golfers
Korn Ferry Tour graduates
Golfers from Connecticut
People from Madison, Connecticut
1983 births
Living people